is a skyscraper in Hamamatsu, Shizuoka Prefecture, Japan. It was constructed in 1994, and houses the Okura City Hotel in its top 17 floors, as well as observation deck on its top floor. The building was designed to resemble a harmonica, acknowledging the musical instrument manufacturers headquartered in Hamamatsu that include Yamaha, Roland, Kawai and Tokai.

See also 
 List of tallest structures in Japan

References 

Skyscraper office buildings in Japan
Buildings and structures in Hamamatsu
Office buildings completed in 1994
Mitsubishi Estate
Skyscraper hotels in Japan
1994 establishments in Japan
Hotel buildings completed in 1994